Edward Donnally is a former American jockey, award-winning newspaper journalist, horse racing handicapper, and TV show host. When a jockey, he sold articles to several major newspapers and other publications, and several articles were written about him being a jockey and writer. While riding in a 1974 race at Boston's Suffolk Downs, he accepted an $800 bribe to keep his horse from finishing worse than a third. The horse won, and during a meeting with the Winter Hill Gang the following day, a member threatened to kill him. In 1978, he was arrested by the FBI and charged with Sports Bribery, a charge that was later dropped.

Biography

He shared his story of redemption in his biography, Ride The White Horse: A Checkered Jockey’s Story of Rage, Racing and Redemption. He has written two other books, and has appeared on several nationwide television shows, including CBN's The 700 Club, CTN's Herman and Sharon Show, and the network's flagship program, The Good Life. He completed the "Break Every Chain Crusade" with his speaking in 30 Texas prisons.

Life journey

He is most notable for winning a race he was paid to lose. As a jockey in October 1974, he took an $800 bribe to keep his mount, Society Boy, from finishing third in a race at Boston's Suffolk Downs Racetrack. But the horse won, and he and his then-wife, Debbie, met with gang members where member Joseph MacDonald threatened to "kill him and put his body on the track’s backstretch as a warning to other jockeys". In 1976, the gang's race-fixing leader, Anthony "Fat Tony" Cuilla, was arrested and became a relocated government witness because he thought the gang would kill him in prison. In 1978, Donnally found himself caught between Boston's Winter Hill Gang, led then by Howard "Howie" Winter with James "Whitey" Bulger, a member and the FBI. He was indicted for Sports Bribery, arrested in a racetrack parking lot, and faced five years in a Federal Prison. He was forced to testify and use his Fifth Amendment rights in the Trial that sentenced Winter Hill Gang members Winters and James Martino and five others to lengthy prison terms. After the trial, charges against Donnally were dropped, and the next year, he retired from riding races. He worked as a journalist for The Dallas Morning News from 1981 to 1989, and in 1984, he became the only former jockey to win Thoroughbred Racing's Eclipse Award for Newspaper Feature Writing for a story on the often injured Hall of Fame Jockey Randy Romero.

References

1943 births
Living people
American jockeys
People from Fayette County, West Virginia
American prisoners and detainees
The Dallas Morning News people